Waya Walalangi (born 5 February 1971) is an Indonesian former professional tennis player.

Walalangi, younger sister of Davis Cup player Donald, competed in the Federation Cup from 1987 to 1989. She featured in five ties and lost both of her singles rubbers but was unbeaten in three doubles rubbers.

A two-time Southeast Asian Games gold medalist, Walalangi had a best singles world ranking of 419 and was ranked as high as 383 in doubles. She won one doubles title while competing on the ITF Women's Circuit.

ITF finals

Doubles: 1 (1–0)

References

External links
 
 
 

1971 births
Living people
Indonesian female tennis players
Competitors at the 1989 Southeast Asian Games
Southeast Asian Games gold medalists for Indonesia
Southeast Asian Games medalists in tennis
20th-century Indonesian women